Heart cell may refer to:

 Cardiomyocyte, a heart muscle cell
 Cardiac pacemaker cell